The 1953–54 Norwegian 1. Divisjon season was the 15th season of ice hockey in Norway. Eight teams participated in the league, and Furuset IF won the championship.

Regular season

Final tiebreaker 
 Furuset IF - Gamlebyen 4:3

External links 
 Norwegian Ice Hockey Federation

Nor
GET-ligaen seasons
1953 in Norwegian sport
1954 in Norwegian sport